Califunya! is an American web variety show directed and written by Los Angeles, California based artist and singer-songwriter Becky Stark. The show is an episodic ensemble comedy featuring a revolving cast of guest stars including Miranda July, Peter Glantz, Tunde Adebimpe, Ron Regé, Jr., Mia Doi Todd, Ariana Delawari, Josh Fadem, and Brandon Ratcliff.

The show was originally produced as a stage show in Los Angeles in 2006, which was followed by a preliminary film shoot in New York City and Los Angeles the same year. A second film shoot was produced in Summer 2009 in Portland, Oregon. Season one entered final post-production in fall 2009.

Format

Like any variety show, Califunya! features musical performances by artists such as The LA Ladies Choir and Colin Meloy of The Decemberists, comedy skits and guest appearances by visual artists like Jim Drain, who also served as the show's art director. The tone of the show was described as "parodying a high school play that is parodying a kids' show from the '60s as performed by grownups—with all the expected exclamation points muted."

It was produced and released in 2009/2010 by Wieden+Kennedy Entertainment.

Episode list

References

External links
Califunya! on YouTube
Show summary and credits

2009 American television series debuts
2010 American television series endings
2000s American variety television series
2010s American variety television series
Wieden+Kennedy